Strawberry Valley is an unincorporated community in Yuba County, California.

A post office opened in Strawberry Valley in 1855. The origin of the name has two competing lines: either from wild strawberries found at the site or from two early settlers, Mr. Straw and Mr. Berry.

Climate

According to the Köppen Climate Classification system, Strawberry Valley has a hot-summer mediterranean climate, abbreviated "Csa" on climate maps.

References

Unincorporated communities in California
Unincorporated communities in Yuba County, California